James Henry Drees (July 6, 1930 – June 20, 2022) was an American politician in the state of Iowa.

Drees was born in Manning, Iowa. He attended Iowa State University and was a farmer. He served in the Iowa House of Representatives from 1995 to 2001, as a Democrat. Drees died on June 20, 2022, at the age of 91.

References

1930 births
2022 deaths
Democratic Party members of the Iowa House of Representatives
People from Carroll County, Iowa
Farmers from Iowa